The modern fly plaid originated with the traditional Féileadh Mòr (Great Plaid) worn in the Scottish Highlands.

The fly plaid harkens back to that garment and was introduced in the 18th century when fashion dictated a switch to the modern kilt. The fly plaid replaced that portion of the Great Kilt that was draped over the shoulder. It is today typically worn in two lengths, from about a metre (39 inches) square to 1.4 metres (56 inches) square (54 inches being a standard fabric width). It is worn in the same tartan or colour as the kilt.

It is typically worn with a jacket that has epaulets, but this is not mandatory, and brooch.

Some fly plaids are sewn so that one corner is gathered prior to attaching the brooch. Others are not sewn and are pleated by hand before draping over the shoulder or inserting through an epaulet

References

Scottish clothing